The 1972 Australian federal election was held in Australia on 2 December 1972. All 125 seats in the House of Representatives were up for election, as well as a single Senate seat in Queensland. The incumbent Liberal–Country coalition government, led by Prime Minister William McMahon, was defeated by the opposition Labor Party led by Gough Whitlam. Labor's victory ended 23 years of successive Coalition governments that began in 1949 and started the three-year Whitlam Labor Government.

Issues
The 1972 election campaign dealt with a combination of Vietnam and domestic policy issues, and the role of the federal government in resolving these issues. The Coalition of the Liberal and Country parties had been in government for 23 years. Successive Coalition governments promoted conservative economics, trade, and defence. However, Australian economic prosperity during the post-war period of the 1950s and 1960s led to the emergence of a range of "quality of life" issues regarding urban development, education, and healthcare. By 1972 these "quality of life" issues came to represent a major political problem for the coalition parties. Traditionally all of these areas had been handled by the state governments, and the Coalition had always asserted the importance of states rights, a view backed by Liberal state premiers like Robert Askin and Henry Bolte. Between 1966 and 1972, Labor leader Gough Whitlam developed policies designed to deal with the problems of urban and regional development using the financial powers granted to the federal government under the Australian Constitution. As Whitlam put it, Labor focused on "cities, schools and hospitals", and these issues were electorally appealing especially to the young and growing baby boomer generation living in the outer suburbs of the major cities.

By contrast, Coalition policies of conservative economic management, increasing trade, and Australian involvement in the Vietnam War disengaged a significant number of Australian voters. Australian involvement in the Vietnam War was initially popular. However, protests grew as the consequences of the war became apparent and the likelihood of a US-led victory diminished. A major part of the protests were directed at conscripting Australians to fight in the war. Liberal policies on Vietnam focused on the need to contain the spread of communism, but the gradual US and Australian troop withdrawal undermined this position. In 1971, Opposition Leader Gough Whitlam visited China. The Coalition heavily criticised the visit, but said criticism soon backfired and became an embarrassment when U.S. President Richard Nixon announced he would visit China the following year.

Finally, the incumbent Prime Minister William McMahon was no match for Whitlam, a witty and powerful orator. McMahon's position was precarious to begin with, for he had only emerged as Liberal Leader after a prolonged period of turmoil following the Coalition's unexpectedly poor showing at the half-Senate election held in 1970, and various state elections. In March 1971, Defence Minister Malcolm Fraser resigned from the ministry and declared that Prime Minister John Gorton was "unfit to hold the great office of Prime Minister". Gorton swiftly called for a vote of confidence in his leadership, which resulted in a 33-33 tie. Gorton could have continued with the result, but stated "Well, that is not a vote of confidence, so the party will have to elect a new leader.", and McMahon won the ensuing leadership contest against Billy Snedden. This turmoil was only further compounded by Gorton immediately being elected as McMahon's deputy; he was ultimately sacked by McMahon for disloyalty in August 1971. These changes all made the Coalition appear weak and divided, and consumed in internal struggles.

McMahon was further weakened by concerns about inflation and negative press coverage. For example, Rupert Murdoch and his newspaper The Australian supported the ALP. The ALP ran a strong campaign under the famous slogan It's Time – a slogan which, coupled with its progressive policy programme, gave it great momentum within the electorate after 23 years of Conservative rule.

The Coalition Party strongly opposed the opening of full diplomatic relationship with Beijing during Mao Zedong's regime concerning the continuation of non-transparent openness honesty on liberties and unprogressive current Chinese economy with valueless productivity.

Results

House of Representatives

Senate

A special Senate election was held in Queensland to replace Liberal senator Annabelle Rankin, who resigned in 1971. Neville Bonner, who had been appointed to fill the casual vacancy by the Queensland Parliament, won the Senate position – the first Indigenous Australian elected to parliament. The election was held at the time of the House of Representatives election as per Section 15 of the Constitution.

Otherwise, no Senate election was held. Since then, every Australian federal election has included a half or full Senate election.

Seats changing hands

 †Jeff Bate and Alex Buchanan contested their seats as independent candidates.

Significance

The 1972 election ended 23 years of Liberal-Country rule, the longest unbroken run in government in Australian history. It is also unusual as Whitlam only scraped into office with a thin majority of four seats; typically, elections that produce a change of government in Australia take the form of landslides (as in the elections of 1949, 1975, 1983, 1996, 2007 or 2013, for example). The comparatively small size of Whitlam's win is partly explained by his strong performance at the previous election in 1969, where he achieved a 7.1% swing and gained 18 seats after Labor had been reduced to 41 of 124 seats and a 43.1% two-party vote in its landslide defeat in 1966.

Prime Minister Gough Whitlam quickly switched the diplomatic recognition from Republic of China (Taiwan) to People's Republic of China a few days before Christmas Day under the respectably one-China policy. The new ruling Labor Party promoted to ease the complicated tension between Australia and China

The new Labor Government of Gough Whitlam was eager to make long-planned reforms, although it struggled against a lack of experience in its cabinet and the onset of the 1973 oil crisis and 1973–75 recession. In addition, the Senate was hostile to Whitlam, with the Coalition and Democratic Labor Parties holding more seats than the ALP, as the term of the Senate at the time was 1971 to 1974. This in particular would make governing difficult, and led to the early double dissolution election of 1974.

See also
 Candidates of the Australian federal election, 1972
 Members of the Australian House of Representatives, 1972-1974

Notes

References
AustralianPolitics.com 1972 election details
"It's Time For Leadership" – Whitlam policy speech, 13 November 1972
University of WA  election results in Australia since 1890
AEC 2PP vote
Prior to 1984, the AEC did not undertake a full distribution of preferences for statistical purposes. The stored ballot papers for the 1983 election were put through this process prior to their destruction. Therefore, the figures from 1983 onwards show the actual result based on full distribution of preferences.

Federal elections in Australia
1972 elections in Australia
Gough Whitlam
December 1972 events in Australia